History of USC may refer to:

History of the University of South Carolina
History of the University of Southern California
History of the United States Congress

See also
USC (disambiguation)